Anwar Saifullah Khan (born 7 June 1945) is a Pakistani politician and industrialist. As a member of the Pakistan Muslim League (Junejo), he served in Prime Minister Nawaz Sharif's cabinet as Federal Minister of Environment and Urban Affairs from 1990 to 1993 and as Federal Minister for Petroleum and Natural Resources from 1994 to 1996 in coalition with Prime Minister Benazir Bhutto.

He was also elected to the Senate from Khyber Pakhtunkhwa in 1990, serving until 1997.

In the 2008 general elections, Saifullah contested for two provincial seats from Lakki Marwat, and was elected to the Khyber Pakhtunkhwa Assembly from both. He became a member of Pakistan People's Party in 2008.

Early life and family
Anwar Saifullah Khan was born in Peshawar into the Saifullah family hailing from Marwat tribe of Pashtuns. He is the son of Begum Kulsum Saifullah, and the brother of politicians Salim and Humayun Saifullah Khan. He is also the son-in-law of President Ghulam Ishaq Khan, and the father-in-law of Omar Ayub Khan, the grandson of Pakistan's former military dictator and President Ayub Khan.

Anwar Saifullah was educated at the University of Peshawar, and Christ Church, Oxford. He took the post of co-chairman of Saif Group, a Pakistani conglomerate, in 1984.

Political career
Anwar Saifullah Khan was elected to the Senate from Khyber Pakhtunkhwa in 1990, serving until 1997 as a member of the Pakistan Muslim League (Junejo). He served in Prime Minister Nawaz Sharif's cabinet as Federal Minister of Environment and Urban Affairs from 1990 to 1993, and as Federal Minister for Petroleum and Natural Resources from 1994 to 1996 in coalition with Prime Minister Benazir Bhutto.

In the 2008 general elections, Saifullah contested for two provincial seats from Lakki Marwat, and was elected to the Khyber Pakhtunkhwa Assembly from both. He later joined Pakistan People's Party as a candidate for Governor of Khyber Pakhtunkhwa, but this was vetoed by coalition partner Awami National Party, a rival of the Saifullah family. He was instead appointed President of PPP Khyber Pakhtunkhwa, but resigned following his defeat in the 2013 general elections.

See also
 Lakki Marwat

References

Pashtun people
Living people
Anwar
People from Lakki Marwat District
Alumni of the University of Oxford
University of Southern California alumni
Pakistan People's Party politicians
1946 births
People named in the Panama Papers
Federal ministers of Pakistan
Members of the Senate of Pakistan